Thái Sơn may refer to several rural communes in Vietnam, including:

Thái Sơn, Haiphong, a commune of An Lão District, Haiphong
Thái Sơn, Cao Bằng, a commune of Bảo Lâm District, Cao Bằng
Thái Sơn, Nghệ An, a commune of Đô Lương District
Thái Sơn, Tuyên Quang, a commune of Hàm Yên District
Thái Sơn, Bắc Giang, a commune of Hiệp Hòa District
Thái Sơn, Thái Bình, a commune of Thái Thụy District